Engineering Agricultural and Medical Common Entrance Test, commonly called as EAMCET, is an entrance examination held separately in the Indian states of Andhra Pradesh and Telangana for admission into various colleges across both the states in the streams of Engineering, Medicine and Agriculture.

Examination
The EAMCET is a yearly examination taken by a large number of engineering and medical aspirants in Andhra Pradesh and Telangana State. This is the entrance exam for engineering ('E' category) and medicine ('AM' category: Agriculture and Medicine) for admission to BE/BArch/BTech (Agril Engg/Dairy Tech).

Eligibility 
Candidates should have passed or appeared for the final year of intermediate examination (10+2) with Mathematics,Physics and Chemistry as optional or related vocational courses in the fields of Engineering and Technology held by the Board of Intermediate Education or Diploma Examination in Engineering/Architecture conducted by the State Board of Technical Education & Training or equivalent. Candidates must have Indian nationality.

2014 
In 2014, the EAMCET exam was conducted on 22 May 2014. There has been controversy regarding the EAMCET counselling after the state of Andhra Pradesh was split into Telangana and Andhra Pradesh. The APSCHE (Andhra Pradesh State Council for Higher Education) has issued the notification for counselling starting 1 August of the academic year and all seats should be positively filled by 15 August. The Telangana government has filed a suit in Supreme court to delay the counselling. The Supreme Court on Monday 1 August 2014 reserved verdict on Telangana State's application seeking extension of the time schedule for counselling for admissions to engineering and medicine for 2014-15 till 31 October. The Supreme court has made it clear that it could extend the counselling for one month and not beyond 31 August. The bench also said there could be no question of preference being given to 'locals' in admission to colleges within Telangana.

2016
AP EAMCET 2016 exam was held on 29 April 2016. This was conducted by JNTU on behalf of APSCHE. TS EAMCET 2016 exam was held on 15 May 2016. TS Eamcet 3 exam was held on 11 September 2016.

2020
Both AP EAMCET and TS EAMCET extended the application form deadline due to COVID-19. TS EAMCET 2020 Exam Dates has been revised. The examination will be conducted from 9 to 14 September 2020 (for Engineering) and 9 & 11 September 2020 (for Agriculture). APEAMCET-2020 test will be conducted on 17th to 25th, September 2020.

Organizing body 
Andhra Pradesh State Council of Higher Education and Telangana State Council of Higher Education conducts the exams AP EAMCET and TS EAMCET respectively.

Organizing institutes 
The below list shows the institute that conducts the exam.

References 

Education in Telangana
Education in Andhra Pradesh
Standardised tests in India
Engineering entrance examinations in India
Year of establishment missing